The 1290 Zhili earthquake occurred on 27 September with an epicenter near Ningcheng, Zhongshu Sheng (Zhili), Yuan China. This region is today administered as part of Inner Mongolia, China. The earthquake had an estimated surface wave magnitude of 6.8 and a maximum felt intensity of IX (Violent) on the Mercalli intensity scale. One estimate places the death toll at 7,270, while another has it at 100,000.

Damage
The earthquake destroyed 480 storehouses and countless houses in Ningcheng. Changping, Hejian, Renqiu, Xiongxian, Baoding, Yixian and Baixiang County were also affected. It severely damaged the Fengguo Temple in Yixian.

See also

 List of earthquakes in China
 List of historical earthquakes

References

1290
13th-century earthquakes
13th century in China
1290 in Asia
History of Inner Mongolia
Yuan dynasty